Jango Edwards (born Stanley Ted Edwards, April 15, 1950, Detroit, Michigan) is an American clown and entertainer who has spent most of his career in Europe, primarily in France, Spain, Netherlands, and England.

Edwards performances are mainly one-man shows in the European cabaret tradition, in which he combines traditional clowning with countercultural and political references.  Edwards built up a cult following over more than three decades of touring Europe with his shows.

Edwards is a native of Detroit, where his family owned a successful landscaping business.  During the late 1960s, he became immersed in radical politics, philosophy, religion, and the esoteric sciences. After three trips to Europe, he decided to give up his possessions in the U.S. and to travel to Europe to study the art of comedy and the clown. He became a busker in London and formed traveling comedy groups there.

Beginning in 1975, he became known as one of the primary organizers and performers at the "International Festival of Fools", an occasional citywide festival of alternative comedy and clown acts in Amsterdam. Edwards gained a fan base in the Netherlands and for many years attracted enthusiastic audiences to his performances there. He also developed a fan base in Germany.  From the 1980s, Edwards spent much of his time in France, where his style of performance was well received. For a time he gave regular performances at a small theatre in the Pigalle district of Paris. More recently, he has been based in Barcelona.
 
Between 1990 and 1998 he had several appearances on an Austrian comedy TV series called Tohuwabohu. 

In 2004, he released a DVD compilation of live performances: Jango Edwards: The Best of Jango.

He also recorded four audio albums: Live at the Melkweg (Milky Way Records LP 1978), Clown Power (Ariola LP 1980), Live in Europe (Polydor LP 1980), Holey Moley (Silenz CD 1991) and two books: Jango Edwards (written in English but with a cover in German) and I Laugh You (Rostrum Haarlem, 1984). The Clown Power album was a limited edition of 3000 copies, each with a different album cover.

In 2009 Edwards opened in Granollers, Barcelona, the "Nouveau Clown Institute" (NCI), a training center specializing in the world of clowning.  Although the NCI has received no government or private funding, it has survived independently.

Bibliography
 "J comme Jango... Edwards", in Improvisation so piano, Jean-Pierre Thiollet, Neva Editions, 2017, p. 66-69.

References

External links

Jango Edwards' channel on YouTube

1950 births
American clowns
Living people
Male actors from Detroit
American expatriates in France
La Ferme Célébrités participants
American mimes
American male film actors
American male television actors
American expatriates in Spain
American expatriates in the Netherlands
American expatriates in the United Kingdom